Nogometna šola Mura, commonly referred to as NŠ Mura or simply Mura, is a Slovenian football team, playing in the town of Murska Sobota. Founded in 2012, the team currently plays in the Slovenian PrvaLiga, the top tier of Slovenian football. The club's home ground is Fazanerija City Stadium with a capacity of 4,506 seats.

The club started competing in the fourth tier of Slovenian football in 2013, and was promoted to the top flight by 2018. In 2020, Mura won its first major trophy after winning the Slovenian national cup. A year later, they became the champions of the Slovenian top division. Nicknamed the "Black and Whites" (Prekmurje Slovene: Čarno-bejli), they play their home games in black-and-white striped kits.

History
After the 2012–13 season, the old ND Mura 05 experienced financial difficulties and was dissolved. The newly established club used its youth club to register a team for the 2013–14 season under the name NŠ Mura. Their first season of play was in 1. MNL Murska Sobota (fourth tier), where they finished second and earned promotion to the Slovenian Third League. In 2016–17 and 2017–18, Mura earned consecutive promotions to reach the top flight of Slovenian football for the first time. In 2018–19, the club finished fourth in the PrvaLiga and qualified for the UEFA Europa League, their first European competition. The club won its first major honour in 2020, defeating second division side Nafta 1903 in the final of the Slovenian Football Cup on 24 June.

In 2020–21, Mura won its first Slovenian national league title after beating Maribor 3–1 in the final round of the season and finished with the same number of points as Maribor, but with a better head-to-head record.

On 26 August 2021, Mura made history by qualifying for their first ever group stage of European club competition. They played against Sturm Graz in the play-off round of the UEFA Europa League, and lost 5–1 on aggregate. As a result, they dropped into UEFA Europa Conference League, becoming only the second ever Slovenian side, after Maribor, to play in a group stage of European competition. Subsequently, Mura was drawn into a group with Vitesse, Rennes and Tottenham Hotspur. After losing the first four games in the group, Mura caused an upset by beating Tottenham 2–1 at home with a last-minute goal from Amadej Maroša. The result was labelled by the English press as one of the most humiliating defeats in Tottenham's entire history, given that they had played in the UEFA Champions League final as recently as 2019. Mura finished the competition in fourth place, with five defeats in six games.

Stadium

Mura play their home matches at Fazanerija City Stadium in Murska Sobota. The stadium was originally built in 1936 and has been expanded and renovated several times since then. It currently has a capacity of 4,506 covered seats. With the standing area included, the total capacity of the stadium is around 4,700.

Players

Current squad

Honours

League  
Slovenian PrvaLiga
Winners: 2020–21
Slovenian Second League
Winners: 2017–18
Slovenian Third League
Runners-up: 2015–16, 2016–17
1. MNL (fourth tier)
Runners-up: 2013–14

Cup 
Slovenian Cup
Winners: 2019–20
MNZ Murska Sobota Cup
Winners: 2016–17, 2017–18

League history

Timeline

European record 
Summary

Matches
All results (home and away) list Mura's goal tally first.

Notes

References

External links

Official website 

Association football clubs established in 2012
Football clubs in Slovenia
2012 establishments in Slovenia